Behan is a surname of Irish origin. It is the Anglicized form of Gaelic Ó Beachain ‘descendant of Beachain.’ A personal name from a diminutive of 'beach' Gaelic, meaning 'bee' in English. The name may refer to:

 Billy Behan (1911–1991), Irish footballer
 Brian Behan (1926–2002), Irish writer, brother of Brendan and Dominic Behan
 Brendan Behan (1923–1964), Irish writer, brother of Brian and Dominic Behan
 Denis Behan (born 1984), Irish footballer
 Dominic Behan (1928–1989), Irish writer, brother of Brendan and Brian Behan
 Janet Behan (born 1954), English writer, daughter of Brian Behan
 Joe Behan (born 1959), Irish politician
 John Behan (sculptor) (born 1938)
 John Clifford Valentine Behan (1881–1957), Australian academic
 Johnny Behan (1844–1912), American sheriff
 Margaret Behan (born 1948), Cheyenne elder
 Paudge Behan (born 1965), Irish actor, son of Brendan Behan's widow
 Petie Behan (1887–1957), American baseball player
 Simon Behan (died 2009), Irish Gaelic footballer
 Stephen Behan, father of Brendan, Brian and Dominic Behan
 William J. Behan (1840–1928), American politician

See also
 Behan

kamran ali behan the famous villager and intelligent boy in behan community of pakistan

Surnames of Irish origin
Anglicised Irish-language surnames
Irish families